Jean-Philippe Charbonnier (28 August 1921 – 28 May 2004) was a French photographer whose works typify the humanist impulse in that medium in his homeland of the period after World War II.

Early life
Jean-Philippe Charbonnier was born in Paris into a family of artists and intellectuals. His mother, Annette Vaillant was a writer and daughter of Alfred Natanson a.k.a. Alfred Athis, a founder of the Revue Blanche, and actress Martha Mellot; his father, Pierre Charbonnier, was a painter, and as a boy, Jean-Philippe met Max Ernst, Pierre Bonnard and the photographer Jacques-Henri Lartigue. His parents separated and he was brought up by  his stepfather, Gustave Moutet. At the Lycée Condorcet in Paris he studied philosophy, English and German, but at 18, Jean-Philippe received a camera from his father who encouraged him to become a photographer, and he discontinued his studies to work in the movie star portrait studio of Sam Lévin ('discoverer' of Brigitte Bardot). He left his hometown to follow Lévin to Lyon, Marseille and Toulon, then went into exile for two years in neutral Switzerland early in the Second World War, where he met with Jean Manevy who instructed him in the art of typography and journalism.

Photojournalism
On return to France in 1944, Charbonnier worked for Théodore (Théo) Blanc (1891–1985) and Antoine (Tony) Demilly (1892–1964) in their darkrooms in Lyon, where he learnt how to print. At the end of the war he photographed, in the village of Vienne, near Grenoble, the execution of a Nazi collaborator in front of a crowd of five thousand people. In the late 40s, he became the chief typesetter for Liberation, and later France Dimanche. He also wrote for Point de Vue, where for the first time his photographs were published, in 1949, by editor Albert Plecy (1914-1977).

In 1950, he was appointed reporter for the magazine Réalités, specializing in stories of French everyday life, but also travelling the world for the magazine. In 1951 he was photographing the Tuaregs in North Africa; in 1954, shoeshine boys in Brazil; as early as 1955 he visited China and then Outer Mongolia, where he was the first Western photographer given a licence to work; then in Moscow during the Cold War; as well as Kuwait, where he made one of his best remembered pictures, of a veiled Kuwaiti woman carrying a sewing machine on her head; the former French Equatorial Africa, where he photographed Albert Schweitzer (and his pelican) in Gabon; and Alaska.

Like Walker Evans in the US, his humanist images are 'straight', or realist. This quality in his work was recognised with inclusion amongst Edith Gérin, Janine Niépce and Sabine Weiss, Marcel Bovis, René-Jacques, Jean Dieuzaide, Jean Marquis, Leon Herschtritt, Jean-Louis Swiners, Eric Schwab, and André Papillon in the exhibition Humanist photography, 1945-1968 at the National Library of France from 31 October 2006 to 28 January 2007. Humanist photography, as it became known in France, though never a formal group or movement, was a post-war movement that helped build a French national identity and iconography, both its picturesque places and its social clichés, but also denounced the harsh realities of the period; the move to the cities and growth of the urban working class, poverty, lack of housing and the fear of the Cold War. This was the style of the Rapho photo agency owned and run by Raymond Grosset (who took it over from founder Charles Rado after the war), of which Charbonnier became a member along with others of the younger generation of photojournalist, including Jean Dieuzaide, Sabine Weiss and Janine Niepce. Like his colleagues, Charbonnier identified closely with the classe populaire and focused on the worker, as exemplified by his image Miner being washed by his wife, 1954. One of his stories for Réalités, published January 1955, in which he employed an objective point of view exposed conditions in a mental hospital that are a valuable document today in gauging the progress of psychiatric treatment (a number of the most powerful images were not published due to the sensitivities of the 1950s), while another of his stories, Hélène et Jean, six heures de voyage à travers l'extase et l'angoisse, follows the consequences of drug addiction and overdose.

Charbonnier decided to leave the magazine Realities in 1974 to concentrate on his Paris neighborhood of Notre-Dame de Paris and produced extended essays on that precinct.

Commercial photography
In the 1960s, with television beginning to replace the glossy magazines, Charbonnier turned increasingly to commercial photography, working for large companies such as Carrefour and Renault, freelancing for the Ministry of Labour and the World Health Organisation and also in the fashion industry, photographing Pierre Cardin, his fashions and models, from 1958.

He taught photography in Paris at the Ecole Supérieure des Arts Graphiques and also in England.

Recognition and legacy
Today Charbonnier's photographs are historical documents showing us the transformation of French society between 1945 and 2004.

Charbonnier was active in his promotion of the profession, contributed vigorously to sessions at Les 30 x 40, the Club Photographique de Paris, and in 1970, at the invitation of writer Michel Tournier, he participated in the first Rencontres d'Arles as a guest of honor, and was included in first public evening meeting of three important 'Photographers of the Moment', with Brihat Denis and Jean-Pierre Sudre. Many photographers from all over France came to this event.

Jean-Philippe Charbonnier married Gisèle Gonfreville, with whom he had two daughters, divorcing her to marry Agathe Gaillard, with whom, in 1975, he opened the first photography gallery in Paris, the Agathe Gaillard Gallery, which dealt in Charbonnier's popular Paris photos. Today, the gallery still exists and shows classic mid-century French photography. He and Agathe had a daughter, Eglantine. In 1996 he married Christine Vaissié, graphic designer and art director, who assisted in the preparation of the great Charbonnier exhibition at the Modern Art Museum of the City of Paris in 1983. She remained with him until the end of his life.

In 1983, he was awarded the Vermeil Medal for Photography by the city of Paris.

Charbonnier died, of a disease contracted during his travels, in Grasse on 28 May 2004, the same year as Henri Cartier-Bresson, whom he regarded as '...a formidable "statue"...THE Living National Treasure at its best...'

 "It took me 30 years and a lot of pain to discover the truth of what Henri Cartier-Bresson always said. One should only use one camera with one lens that coincides with your angle of vision, with the same film at its normal speed. The rest is just gimmick and hardware." (Jean-Philippe Charbonnier. In: Colin Naylor, ed. Contemporary Photographers, Chicago and London, St. James, 1998.)

References

External links
    
 www.luminous-lint.com 
 Photosapiens 
 Reporters sans Frontieres 
 

 

1921 births
2004 deaths
Photographers from Paris
French photojournalists
Fashion photographers
Humanist photographers